William Henry Sparks (January 16, 1800 – January 13, 1882) was an American lawyer and occasional poet famous now only for his autobiographical memoir.

Life
Sparks was born on St. Simon's Island, Georgia, and grew up in Greene County, Georgia. After studying law at Litchfield Law School in Connecticut, he opened a law practice in Greensboro, Georgia. He was elected to the Georgia legislature. By 1830 he moved to Natchez, Mississippi, to raise sugar. From 1852–1861 he had a practice of law in New Orleans, Louisiana, in partnership with Judah P. Benjamin, later a cabinet officer of the Confederate States of America and then a successful attorney in England. Sparks published his autobiographical "The Memories of Fifty Years" in 1870. The work consists of a wide variety of observations Sparks kept note of during his lifetime. Sparks died in Marietta, Georgia, on January 13, 1882.

Works 
 The Memories of Fifty Years (1870)

References

External links 
 
 

1800 births
1882 deaths
Louisiana lawyers
19th-century American memoirists
19th-century American lawyers
Occasional poets